Kashmeer is  an Indian TV series which was telecasted on Star Plus in 2003. It was set in the Kashmir Valley and starred Gul Panag.

Plot
A saga of love and hatred is set in breathtakingly beautiful locales with the backdrop of militancy.

Cast

 Gul Panag as Zoya Wani
 Vishal Singh as Kinshuk Kachroo 	
 Ankur Nayyar as Aamir Bhatt
 Farooque Sheikh as Prof. Bansi Lal Kachroo
 Nirmal Pandey
 Vineet Kumar
 Suresh Oberoi as Dr. Ashfaqullah Wani
 Kulbhushan Kharbanda as Bakshi Ghulam Mohd.
 Salim Shah as Saifuddin Bhatt
 Neelima Azeem as Munira Bhatt
 Smita Jaykar as Shama Wani

References

External links

 

StarPlus original programming
2003 Indian television series debuts
Television shows set in Jammu and Kashmir
Kashmir conflict in fiction
Indian Armed Forces in fiction